Round Hill is a rural locality in the Gladstone Region, Queensland, Australia.

Geography
The upper reaches of the north branch of Baffle Creek form part of the western boundary.

References 

Gladstone Region
Localities in Queensland